John Kovalic (born Robert John Kovalic, Jr. on 24 November 1962) is an American cartoonist, illustrator, and writer.

Career
Born in Manchester, England, Kovalic is best known for his Dork Tower comic book, comic strip, and webcomic, and other humorous work set in and about the fantasy role-playing game genre, such as The Unspeakable Oaf. He has illustrated board and card games for several companies, including Steve Jackson Games (notably the Munchkin card game, plus its many expansions and derivatives, and Chez Geek and its derivatives), Cumberland Games & Diversions (Pokéthulhu), and the third edition of Fantasy Flight Games's Mag Blast. He was also the sole illustrator for the "Super Deluxx" edition of Kobolds Ate My Baby! and has subsequently occasionally featured supplemental KAMB material in the Dork Tower comic book.

Kovalic is a co-founder and co-owner of Out of the Box Publishing. He is also the company's art director and designer of the 2003 trivia party game Whad'Ya Know?, based on Michael Feldman's Whad'Ya Know?, as well as the illustrator of Apples to Apples.

Kovalic is an editorial cartoonist for the Wisconsin State Journal. His work has appeared in The New York Times and The Washington Post, and he continues to freelance for Milwaukee's The Daily Reporter. He has also worked for CARtoons Magazine. He is also the writer of the comic Doctor Blink Superhero Shrink, which is penciled and inked by Christopher Jones and colored and lettered by Melissa Kaercher.

Honors
Kovalic's cartoons are multi–Origins Award–winners and have been nominated for two Harvies—for best cartoonist and the special award for humor in comics. USA Today called Kovalic a "Hot Pick". In 2003, Kovalic became the first cartoonist inducted into the Academy of Adventure Gaming's Hall of Fame.

Kovalic has thrice been a guest of honor—in 2003, 2007, and 2008—at the science, science fiction, and fantasy convention CONvergence., and on multiple occasions at Warpcon in Cork, Ireland.

List of games illustrated 
Kovalic has provided illustrations for large number of games, including:

 10 Days series
 aBRIDGEd
 Apples to Apples series
 Backseat Drawing
 Blink
 Bosworth
 Button Men: Dork Victory
 Cash n' Guns Second Edition
 Chain Game
 Chez Geek series
 Cineplexity
 Cloud 9
 Cover Up
 Creatures and Cultists
 Creepyfreaks
 Dork 20
 Dork Tower: The Boardgame
 Dungeonville
 Easy Come, Easy Go
 Escape from Elba
 Fish Eat Fish
 Gold Digger
 Illuminati: New World Order series
 Kobolds Ate My Baby!
 Letter Flip
 Letter Roll
 Mag Blast
 Mix Up
 Munchkin series
 Munchkin Quest
 My Dwarfs Fly
 My Word!
 Ninja Versus Ninja
 Nutty Cups
 Party Pooper
 Pepper
 PokeTHULHU
 Quitch
 Rock
 ROFL!
 Shape Up
 ShipWrecked
 Snorta
 Squint
 Tutankhamen
 Wallamoppi
 Warhamster Rally
 Whad'Ya Know?
 Wheedle
 ZenBenders series

References

External links
 Dork Tower
 
 
 

1962 births
American comic strip cartoonists
American webcomic creators
English comics artists
English comics writers
Living people
Artists from Manchester